Sappa Township is one of sixteen townships in Harlan County, Nebraska, United States. The population was 324 at the 2000 census. A 2006 estimate placed the township's population at 298.

The Village of Stamford lies within the Township.

See also
County government in Nebraska

References

External links
City-Data.com

Townships in Harlan County, Nebraska
Townships in Nebraska